Audelia is an area in Dallas, Texas, United States that used to be a distinct unincorporated community in Dallas County. The Audelia site is located three miles south of what is now Richardson.

By 1981 Audelia was within Dallas. The area is now part of the Lake Highlands area, sometimes being referred to as North Lake Highlands.

References

External links
 AUDELIA, TEXAS at Handbook of Texas

Neighborhoods in South Dallas